The following was a list of squads for each nation competing the 2012 Nehru Cup in New Delhi, India. The tournament began on 23 August.

Squads

India
Coach:  Wim Koevermans

Cameroon
Coach:  Paul Le Guen

Nepal
Coach: Krishna Thapa

Maldives
Coach:  István Urbányi

Syria
Coach: Marwan Khouri

Player Representation

By Club

By Club Nationality

References

Nehru Cup squads
squads